The 2015–16 Kansas Jayhawks men's basketball team represented the University of Kansas in the 2015–16 NCAA Division I men's basketball season, which is the Jayhawks 118th basketball season. The Jayhawks played their home games at Allen Fieldhouse. They were led by 13th year head coach Bill Self and were members of the Big 12 Conference. They finished the season 33–5, 15–3 in Big 12 play to win their 12th consecutive regular season Big 12 title. They defeated Kansas State, Baylor, and West Virginia to be champions of the Big 12 tournament. They received an automatic bid to the NCAA tournament where they were the tournament's overall #1 seed. They defeated Austin Peay, UConn, and Maryland to advance to the Elite Eight where they lost to Villanova.

The Jayhawks 12 consecutive regular season Big 12 titles was at the time the longest active consecutive conference title streak in the nation, as well as only being one shy of the NCAA record of 13, which is currently held by UCLA who won 13 in a row between 1967 and 1979.

In July 2015, the Jayhawks represented the United States at the World University Games in Gwangju, South Korea. The Jayhawks, along with Nic Moore from SMU and Julian DeBose from Florida Gulf Coast, went 8–0 to win the Gold Medal.

Preseason

Departures

Graduation

Early draft entrants

Transfers

Recruiting

|-
| colspan="7" style="padding-left:10px;" | Overall recruiting rankings:      Scout: #14     Rivals: #15     247Sports: #19       ESPN: #14 
|}

Transfers 

|-
|}

World University Games

In April 2014, the Kansas basketball team was selected by the United States International University Sports Federation (US-IUSF) to represent the United States in the 2015 World University Games. Kansas was selected as the team to represent the U.S. from the schools that expressed interest. This was the second time a college team represented the United States in the World University Games; University of Northern Iowa had finished 9th in 2007.

Current university students or recent graduates, born between Jan. 1, 1990, and Dec. 31, 1997, were eligible for the 2015 Games. Only U.S. citizens were eligible for the U.S. team; therefore Cheick Diallo, Sviatoslav Mykhailiuk, and Dwight Coleby (from Mali, Ukraine, and Bahamas respectively) were ineligible. The Kansas travel party, consisting of 12 competitors and 11 staff (23 total), left Lawrence on June 28 and lived in the athlete village throughout the Games. There were two non-Jayhawks on the U.S. roster: guards Nic Moore of SMU and Julian DeBose of Florida Gulf Coast, replacing injured Kansas guard Devonte' Graham.

Team USA won all their matches in the tournament, beating Germany 84–77 in double overtime on July 13, 2015, to win the gold medal.

Roster

Schedule

|-
!colspan=12 style="background:#0022B4; color:white;"| World University Games Exhibition

|-
!colspan=12 style="background:#0022B4;"| 

|-
!colspan=12 style="background:#0022B4; color:white;"| Exhibition

|-
!colspan=12 style="background:#0022B4; color:white;"| Regular season

|-

|-
!colspan=12 style="background:#0022B4; color:white;"| Big 12 Tournament

|-
!colspan=12 style="background:#0022B4; color:white;"| NCAA tournament

Source:

Rankings

*AP does not release post-tournament rankings

References

Kansas Jayhawks men's basketball seasons
Kansas
2015 in sports in Kansas
2016 in sports in Kansas
Kansas